Lancaster Skies is a 2019 British war film focusing on the British bomber campaign in World War II. It is a homage to the British war films of the 1940s and 1950s.

Plot
1943: Angry and bereaved by the death of his younger brother, Flight Lieutenant Douglas Miller, a broken, solitary, Spitfire ace, who survived the Battle of Britain, transfers to RAF Bomber Command, determined to take the war to the skies over Germany. On arriving at his new posting, he is given the unenviable task of replacing the much-loved skipper of an experienced Lancaster bomber crew, who was killed in action just days before. Struggling to bond with his new crew and obsessed with his desire to wage war at any cost, Miller tries to find a way to gain their trust and overcome his inner demons, to become the leader they need.

Cast
Jeffrey Mundell as Douglas Miller
David Dobson as George Williams
Kris Saddler as Charlie Moore
Joanne Gale as Kate Hedges
Vin Hawke as Thomas Mayfield
Steven Hooper as James Parker
Henry Collie as Robert Murphy
Josh Collins as Henry Smith
Rosa Coduri as Jo
Tom Gordon as Alfie Hammond
Eric Flynn as Ron Miller
Pete Wayre as a Sq. Leader in briefing

Production
With a total budget of £80,000, the visual elements proved very challenging. In keeping with the retro style of the film, scale models were used for most visual effects. Digital effects were kept to a minimum.

Reception
The Guardian gave the film two stars, saying Lancaster Skies feels like cinema made in a sensory deprivation tank—fear, desperation and the roar of engines are all missing in action. When the climactic battle sequence finally arrives there's little dread or excitement.'

Every Film Blog gave the film 6/10 and said, 'Burn didn't have money to throw around on Lancaster Skies but he has, nevertheless, created a movie which makes its audience think.'

Road Rash Reviews gave the film 5/5, saying Lancaster Skies is a World War II tale that is strongly character driven, with high production values, which set this film at a stratospheric height.'

See also
Spitfire Over Berlin, Burn's follow-up 2022 film, also about WW2 pilots.

References

External links
Official website

2010s war films
British World War II films
British aviation films
Battle of Britain films
British war epic films
World War II aviation films
World War II films based on actual events
Films about shot-down aviators
Films set in England
Films set in Germany
Films set in 1943
2010s English-language films
2010s British films